Louise Lincoln Kerr (April 24, 1892 – December 10, 1977) was an American musician, composer, and philanthropist from Cleveland, Ohio. She wrote over 100 music compositions including fifteen symphonic tone poems, twenty works for chamber or string orchestra, a violin concerto, five ballets and incidental music, numerous piano pieces, and about forty pieces of chamber music. She was known as "The Grand Lady of Music" for her patronage of the arts. Louise Kerr helped to co-found and developed The Phoenix Symphony (1947), The Phoenix Chamber Music Society (1960), The Scottsdale Center for the Arts, The National Society of Arts and Letters (1944) (in Phoenix), Monday Morning Musicals, The Bach and Madrigal Society (1958) (now the Phoenix Chorale), Young Audiences, The Musicians Club, and the Phoenix Cello Society (now the Arizona Cello Society). Kerr was also a benefactor to the Herberger School of Music at Arizona State University. She was inducted into the Arizona Women's Hall of Fame on October 21, 2004 and was nominated by conductor and musicologist Carolyn Waters Broe.

Biography

Early life 
Louise Lincoln was born in Cleveland, Ohio on April 24, 1892. Her father, John C. Lincoln, was a notable engineer who founded Lincoln Electric. She was born Myrtie Louise Lincoln after her mother Myrtle and her grandmother Louisa but changed her name to Louise Lincoln in grade school before 1905. Kerr's mother Myrtle was a musician and taught Louise how to play the piano at age six, violin at age seven, and she later learned to play viola. Lincoln furthered her skills under Sol Marcosson, a concertmaster of the early Cleveland Symphony Orchestra (CSO).

Education and career 
Louise Lincoln attended Barnard College in the year 1910 in New York City, an institution with strong ties to Columbia University. Columbia Professor David Gregory Mason taught her elementary music form and advanced harmony and Professor Cornelius Rubner taught her composition and symphonic orchestration. Lincoln won a pair of awards for her vocal compositions while attending college. She also studied for a time with Igor Stravinsky and Sergei Prokofiev. While at Barnard, she took private violin lessons with Dutch soloist Christiaan Timmner at the Institute of Musical Art, which would later become part of the Juilliard School of Music. She left New York around 1913 due to the death of her mother and to join the Cleveland Municipal Orchestra under the direction of Christiaan Timmner. When Timmner was appointed conductor of the early CSO, he extended an invitation to Lincoln to join his violin section. She was one of the youngest members of the orchestra and one of only two women.

By 1920 she had returned to New York after she married Peter Kjer (pronounced "Care") and started her family of eight children. During this time, she did not play her violin nor compose. While in New York, she got a job working for the Aeolian Company proofing piano rolls for player pianos. There Louise Kerr met with noted pianists and composers who were recording their music, including Sergei Prokofiev, Alfred Cortot, and George Gershwin. Gershwin worked for Aeolian Company at the same time as Kerr. She was also a friend of the renowned conductor of the New York Philharmonic, Dimitri Mitropoulos, and the violinist Isaac Stern.

When one of her daughters developed a respiratory condition, the Kjer family moved to Phoenix, Arizona in 1936. They also built homes in Cottonwood and Scottsdale, Arizona and Pasadena, California. They changed their name to Kerr to match the name of actress Deborah Kerr. After Peter Kerr died in 1939, Louise returned to music composition. In 1940 she buried two of her daughters. One died of tuberculosis and the other in an accident in Flagstaff, Arizona. While in Los Angeles, Kerr's violin was stolen on December 7, 1941. Later, she continued to perform on the viola as her main instrument with the Pasadena Symphony, Phoenix and Flagstaff Symphonies. She was a founding member of the Phoenix Symphony when it was founded in 1947, donating funds and property for the organization.

Kerr's symphonic piece "Arizona Profiles" was commissioned for the groundbreaking dedication ceremonies of the Scottsdale Center for the Performing Arts in 1968 and premiered by the Phoenix Symphony. Four Seasons Orchestra performed her Enchanted Mesa at the concert of Surprise Stadium in the year 2004 and also at Phoenix in June 2009. The same orchestra is known for arranging the European premiere of Kerr's Enchanted Mesa in Vienna, Austria on June 27, 2009 for the Haydn Festival and have performed several of her chamber orchestra and chamber music pieces for the Arizona Centennial in 2012. The Four Seasons String Quartet performed her String Quartet in A Major in 2001 at ASU and several other places.

Her ballet Tableau Vivant was commissioned for the installation of John Waddell's twelve statues in front of Phoenix Symphony Hall and premiered by the Phoenix Symphony in 1975. Very few of Kerr's works have been officially edited or published publicly.

Legacy 
Louise Lincoln Kerr died at her ranch in Cottonwood, Arizona, on December 10, 1977, of heart failure. She left a legacy in her estate to the College of Fine Arts at Arizona State University. She was a major benefactor of the School of Music at Arizona State University by establishing the Kerr Memorial Scholarship Fund. Kerr presented her private music library to the ASU Herberger School of Music. She also donated her extensive collection of orchestral and chamber music manuscripts (labeled MSS-90) to the ASU Archives and Manuscripts at Haydn Library. In addition, she donated her Scottsdale home and studio to ASU to be used as a chamber music venue, now the ASU Kerr Cultural Center. She received a gold medal for distinguished contribution to the arts from the National Society of the Arts and Letters. Shortly before her death, Louise Kerr was awarded an honorary Doctorate from ASU, however she was unable to receive this award in person. Throughout her career, Louise Kerr composed over 100 works. Kerr was posthumously inducted into the Arizona Women's Hall of Fame on October 21, 2004. Her former home and studio in Scottsdale was recognized with a listing on the National Register of Historic Places on April 14, 2010. Concerts are still being performed at this venue. This is now an Arizona State and National Heritage site.

Compositional style 
Louise Lincoln's compositional style has been determined as being tonal and the same is also found to be influenced by romantic and classical genre. Her music has been categorized to be typically showing Southwest Impressionism as her creations were found to be heavily influenced by the local peculiarity of American Southwest. Such characterization had been furthered by the creations of influences of impressionist painters from California and Arizona during her stay for the years 1940s. It is also a fact that she and her elder daughter Tammara, both were painters. Analysis of Kerr's music shows the inclusion of musical elements of local cowboys and the cultures of local Native Americans and Hispanics. Some of her pieces have been found to be having influences from her famous co-workers (pianists) while her stay at New York during 1920s. In addition to that, some jazz influences are also found at some of the pieces. According to her son William Kerr, even though she had the means and contacts to publish her music in New York, Louise Kerr refrained from doing the same, showing the modest part of her. Almost all of her creations are officially unpublished. Also, not all of her creations could be dated and premiere dates and names of compositions were also found lost after her death. Though some has carried out the analysis of her music based on the availability, a full picture of ascertaining the same had not been possible due to the fact that Reel to Reel recordings of most of the premiere dates of her creations had been lost. Five Character Pieces for Viola and Piano, edited by Carolyn Waters Broe, is the first of Kerr's published works. American Viola Society have also published a new edition of Kerr's  “Etude for Violin and Viola”.

Work list

Bibliography 
 Five Character Pieces for Viola and Piano – Louise Lincoln Kerr, Ed. Carolyn Waters Broe, (Scottsdale, AZ: Classics Unlimited Music, 2002)
 The String Compositions of Louise Lincoln Kerr Analysis and Editing of Five Solo Viola Pieces – Carolyn Waters Broe, 
 Four Seasons Orchestra's CD release of Arizona Profiles The Music of Louise Lincoln Kerr.

References

Sources 
 "Scottsdale Civic Center Audience Gives Standing Ovation To Mrs. Kerr", Phoenix Gazette, October 1968,
 "John Henrey Waddell/Sculptor And Painter Metal Master Sculptor Breathes Life Into Bronze Figures." Phoenix The Arizona Republic, May 2, 1993, Page 14
 "A Gracious Lady Dies." Scottsdale Daily Progress, December 13, 1977.
 "Louise L. Kerr, arts patron, dies." Scottsdale Daily Progress, December 12, 1977
 Kelly Tim. "Face of Arizona Louise Lincoln Kerr, Musician." Phoenix Point West, February 1965, p. 30-34.
 Portnoff, Collice. "Composer – of Note Louise Kerr." Phoenix (Arizona) Southwest Art Scene, March 1968, vol. 1, no. 7.
 Drobatschewsky, Dimitri. "Kerr Tribute to Honor 'Lively Lady'." Phoenix The Arizona Republic, December 11, 1977.
 "Death of arts backer Louise Lincoln Kerr "Grand Lady of Music." Phoenix The Arizona Republic, December 11, 1977.
 "Oral History." Transcript by Portnoff, Collice, Department of Archives and Manuscripts, University Libraries, Arizona State University, Tempe, AZ.
 "Through the Years A Quiet Woman Built and Broadened Valley Arts," Scottsdale Progress, March 14, 1975.
 Yearwood, Pauline. "Symphony of Memories," Jewish News of Greater Phoenix, Vol. 46, No. 48, August 19, 1994.
 Portnoff, Collice. "Composer – of Note Louise Kerr." Phoenix (Arizona) Southwest Art Scene, March 1968, vol. 1, no. 7.
 Pyne, Lynn. "Sculpture Without Wraps John Waddell Creates Bronze Statues That Reflect Life." The Phoenix Gazette, November 30, 1991, Section: Marquee, p. 4.
 "Louise Kerr." Phoenix The Arizona Republic, October 12, 1978, p. D-7.
 "Louise L. Kerr, arts patron, dies." Scottsdale Daily Progress, December 12, 1977.
 "Louise Lincoln Kerr," editorial, Phoenix The Arizona Republic, December 12, 1977.

1892 births
1977 deaths
20th-century classical violinists
American classical violinists
Barnard College alumni
Classical musicians from Ohio
Musicians from Cleveland
Musicians from Phoenix, Arizona
Musicians from Scottsdale, Arizona
Women classical violinists
Classical musicians from Arizona
20th-century American violinists